War Eagle is an unincorporated community located in Mingo County, West Virginia, United States.

History

A post office called War Eagle was established in 1902, and remained in operation until it was discontinued in 1959. War Eagle took its name from a local mining company.

References 

Unincorporated communities in West Virginia
Unincorporated communities in Mingo County, West Virginia
Coal towns in West Virginia